The 1971 Brownlow Medal was the 44th year the award was presented to the player adjudged the fairest and best player during the Victorian Football League (VFL) home and away season. Ian Stewart of the Richmond Football Club won the medal by polling twenty-one votes during the 1971 VFL season.

Leading votegetters

References 

1971 in Australian rules football
1971